Preston North End Football Club, an English association football club based in the Deepdale area of Preston, Lancashire, was founded in 1880. For their first eight years, there was no league football, so matches were arranged on an occasional basis, supplemented by cup competitions organised at both local and national level. In 1888, Preston participated in the inaugural Football League. They won the first top-flight league title and of the 22 matches they won 18 and drew the other four, therefore they remained undefeated thus being labelled "The Invincibles". They were the only team to be known by this nickname for 115 years until Arsenal completed their 2003–04 season without a defeat. Since then the club has remained in the Football League although it has competed in its various divisions.

Preston North End's record against each club faced league competition is listed below. Preston's first league game was against Burnley in the inaugural 1888–89 Football League. They met their 109th and most recent different league opponent, Burton Albion, for the first time in the 2016–17 EFL Championship season. The team that Preston North End has met most in league competition is Burnley, against whom they have contested 127 league matches; having won 52 of these Burnley are also the side Preston have beaten the most. Preston have tied 33 games with Bolton Wanderers, they are the team that they have drawn with the most. The team that has defeated Preston the most is Aston Villa, who have won 51 of their 104 encounters with Preston.

Key
 The table includes results of matches played by Preston North End in the English Football League (1888–present)
 For the sake of simplicity, present-day names are used throughout: for example, results against Newton Heath, Small Heath and Woolwich Arsenal are integrated into the records against Manchester United, Birmingham City and Arsenal, respectively
   Teams with this background and symbol in the "Club" column are competing in the 2022–23 EFL Championship alongside Preston
   Clubs with this background and symbol in the "Club" column are defunct
 P = matches played; W = matches won; D = matches drawn; L = matches lost; F = goals for; A = goals against; Win% = percentage of total matches won
 The columns headed "First" and "Last" contain the first and most recent seasons in which Preston played league matches against each opponent

All-time league record
Statistics correct as of matches played on 21 January 2023.

Footnotes

References
General
 
 

Specific

league records by opponent
English football club league records by opponent